Frolovka is a rural locality (a selo) and the administrative center of Frolovsky Selsoviet of Seryshevsky District, Amur Oblast, Russia. The population was 151 as of 2018. There are 6 streets.

Geography 
Frolovka is located 35 km east of Seryshevo (the district's administrative centre) by road. Borispol is the nearest rural locality.

References 

Rural localities in Seryshevsky District